Prince Baffoe (born 10 October 1993) is a Ghanaian footballer who currently plays for Inter Allies.

Career
Baffoe signed with United Soccer League side Penn FC on loan from Inter Allies.

References

External links

1993 births
Living people
Ghanaian footballers
Penn FC players
Association football midfielders
USL Championship players
Techiman Eleven Wonders FC players